Calenberger Bach (also: Fließbach, in its upper course: Ostertalsbach) is a small river of Hesse and North Rhine-Westphalia, Germany. It flows into the Diemel in Warburg.

See also
List of rivers of Hesse
List of rivers of North Rhine-Westphalia

References

Rivers of Hesse
Rivers of North Rhine-Westphalia
Rivers of Germany